Marvels is a 1994 Marvel Comics limited comic book series.

Marvels may also refer to:

 MARVELS (Multi-object APO Radial Velocity Exoplanet Large-area Survey}, in astronomy
 Marvels (Theopompus), an ancient Greek work on history/mythology

See also
 Marvel (disambiguation)
 The Marvels (disambiguation)